René Nicolas Adrien Hamel (14 October 1902 – 7 November 1992) was a French cyclist. He won the Gold Medal in Team road race  along with Armand Blanchonnet and Georges Wambst and won the Bronze medal in Individual road race.

References

1902 births
1992 deaths
French male cyclists
Olympic cyclists of France
Olympic gold medalists for France
Olympic bronze medalists for France
Cyclists at the 1924 Summer Olympics
Olympic medalists in cycling
Place of birth missing
Medalists at the 1924 Summer Olympics